The Cissianti were a tribe of Iranian Nomads who likely spoke a Sarmatian language of the Scythian family.  They are mentioned by Pliny the Elder as living north of the Amazons and Hyperboreans, with the Cimmeri, Acae, Georgili, Moschi, Cercetae, Phoristae, and Rimphaces.

References 

 
Ancient peoples
Sarmatian tribes
Iranian nomads